Vito Chimenti (9 December 1953 – 29 January 2023) was an Italian football player and manager, who played as a forward.

Club career

During his club career, Chimenti played as a striker for several Italian teams in Serie A, Serie B and Serie C.

He first played for Avis Edilsport Altamura before joining Matera, where he played his first Serie C championship in the 1972–73 season. After a brief season with Lazio, he returned to Serie C, first with Lecco, then with Salernitana and Matera.

In the 1977–78 season, he moved to Palermo in Serie B, where he played two seasons and scored 29 goals overall. During the second campaign, he scored the opening goal for Palermo in the first minute of the 1978–79 Coppa Italia final, which eventually ended in a 2–1 loss against Juventus. In the same occasion, Chimenti had to come out of the pitch at half time, due to a knee injury caused by a foul by Antonio Cabrini.

In the summer of 1979, he joined Serie A side Catanzaro, where he subsequently made his top-tier debut on 16 September 1979; however, he would only score once in the league. He then moved to fellow top-flight club Pistoiese, where he scored nine goals throughout the 1980–81 season: although the team finished at the bottom of the league table and got relegated, Chimenti became Pistoiese's top scorer in Serie A, a record he still holds.

In the summer of 1981, he moved to Avellino, where he scored 3 goals. Following his disqualification, the striker put his playing career to an end.

Managerial career 

After he retired from playing football, Chimenti pursued a managerial career, serving as a head coach or an assistant coach for several Italian teams.

Style of play 
Chimenti was a forward known for his goal-scoring prowess, who also became famous for his trademark dribbling technique, called bicicletta ("bicycle"), which should not be confused with the bicycle kick.

Personal life and death 
Vito was the brother of former forward Francesco Chimenti, as well as the uncle of former goalkeeper Antonio Chimenti.

Chimenti died from a heart attack in Pomarico on 29 January 2023, at the age of 69.

References

1953 births
2023 deaths
Footballers from Bari
Italian footballers
Association football midfielders
Matera Calcio players
Calcio Lecco 1912 players
U.S. Salernitana 1919 players
Palermo F.C. players
S.S. Lazio players
U.S. Catanzaro 1929 players
U.S. Pistoiese 1921 players
U.S. Avellino 1912 players
Taranto F.C. 1927 players
A.C.R. Messina managers
Rimini F.C. 1912 managers
S.S. Virtus Lanciano 1924 managers
U.S. Salernitana 1919 managers
Serie A players
Serie B players
Serie C players
Serie D players